Moubarak "Mbark" Boussoufa (born 15 August 1984) is a former professional footballer who played as an attacking midfielder or winger. He won the Belgian Golden Shoe in 2006 and 2010. Born in the Netherlands, he represented the Morocco national team from 2006 to 2019 making 70 appearances and scoring eight goals.

Club career

Boussoufa started off at the youth academy of Ajax before joining Chelsea F.C. He spent the 2005–06 season with K.A.A. Gent, winning several prizes in 2006: Belgian Golden Shoe, Belgian Footballer of the Year, Belgian Young Footballer of the Year and Belgian Ebony Shoe.

In June 2006, Boussoufa signed a four-year contract with R.S.C. Anderlecht after a €3.5 million transfer. In his first season he was a regular in the title-clinching squad. He became a key player for the team that finished second in both the 2007–2008 and the 2008–09 seasons. Boussoufa was named Belgian Footballer of the Year for a second time after the 2008–09 season in which Anderlecht barely missed out on the title, losing the Championship play-off against Standard de Liège. The next year, he managed 14 goals and 24 assists which made him the most valuable player in Anderlecht's championship-winning squad. He was named Belgian Footballer of the Year for a second consecutive time and the third time overall. After the season, he renewed his contract with a significant raise, making him the best paid footballer in Belgium. He won the Belgian Golden Shoe for the second time in 2010.

In March 2011, Russian side FC Terek Grozny announced his signing, but his transfer fell through three days later. Instead, Boussoufa signed for another Russian team, Anzhi Makhachkala.

Boussoufa signed a three-year contract with FC Lokomotiv Moscow in August 2013. With Lokomotiv he won the 2015 Russian Cup, scoring the second goal as they beat Kuban Krasnodar 3–1 after extra time in the final. He returned to K.A.A. Gent on loan from in February 2016.

In July 2016, Boussoufa signed a two-year contract with UAE club Al Jazira. He made 16 appearances and scored three times as Al-Jazira went on to win the 2016-17 UAE Arabian Gulf League.

On 3 January 2019, Boussoufa signed a contract until the end season with Saudi club Al-Shabab.

International career
Eligible to play for both Morocco and The Netherlands, Boussoufa chose to represent Morocco and made his international debut against the USA on 23 May 2006.

Boussoufa has represented Morocco at Africa Cup of Nations tournaments; in 2012, 2017 and 2019.

In May 2018, he was named in Morocco's 23-man squad for the 2018 FIFA World Cup in Russia.

On 5 July 2019, Boussoufa announced his retirement after Morocco's loss against Benin in the round of 16, 4–1 in penalties (following a 1–1 draw), in the 2019 Africa Cup of Nations.

Career statistics

Club

International

Scores and results list Morocco's goal tally first, score column indicates score after each Boussoufa goal.

Honours
Anderlecht
 Belgian First Division: 2006–07, 2009–10
 Belgian Cup: 2007–08
 Belgian Supercup: 2007, 2010

Anzhi Makhachkala
 Russian Cup runners-up: 2012–13

Lokomotiv Moscow
 Russian Cup: 2014–15

Al Jazira
 UAE Arabian Gulf League: 2016–17

Individual
 Best Gent player of the Season: 2005–06
Belgian Young Professional Footballer of the Year: 2005–06
 Belgian Professional Footballer of the Year: 2005–06, 2008–09, 2009–10
Man of the Season (Belgian First Division): 2005–06
 Best africain player in Belgium: 2005–06, 2008–09, 2009–10
Belgian Golden Shoe: 2006, 2010
Belgian Lion Award: 2010, 2011

References

External links
 Profile on Anzhi Makhachkala official website 
 
 
 Boussoufa named as Belgium's finest By Berend Scholten @ UEFA.com  Boussoufa named as Belgium's finest By Berend Scholten @ UEFA.com

1984 births
Living people
Dutch sportspeople of Moroccan descent
Citizens of Morocco through descent
Footballers from Amsterdam
Association football midfielders
Dutch footballers
Moroccan footballers
Morocco international footballers
2012 Africa Cup of Nations players
2017 Africa Cup of Nations players
K.A.A. Gent players
R.S.C. Anderlecht players
FC Anzhi Makhachkala players
FC Lokomotiv Moscow players
Al Jazira Club players
Al-Shabab FC (Riyadh) players
Al-Sailiya SC players
Belgian Pro League players
Russian Premier League players
UAE Pro League players
Saudi Professional League players
Qatar Stars League players
Dutch expatriate footballers
Moroccan expatriate footballers
Expatriate footballers in Belgium
Expatriate footballers in Russia
Expatriate footballers in the United Arab Emirates
Expatriate footballers in Saudi Arabia
Expatriate footballers in Qatar
Moroccan expatriate sportspeople in Belgium
Moroccan expatriate sportspeople in Russia
Moroccan expatriate sportspeople in the United Arab Emirates
Moroccan expatriate sportspeople in Saudi Arabia
Moroccan expatriate sportspeople in Qatar
2018 FIFA World Cup players
2019 Africa Cup of Nations players